Thomas Hat, of Shaftesbury, Dorset (died after 1432), was an English Member of Parliament.

He was a Member (MP) of the Parliament of England for Shaftesbury in November 1414 and 1425. He was mayor of Shaftesbury 1403–4 and 1409–10.

References

14th-century births
15th-century deaths
English MPs November 1414
Mayors of Shaftesbury
English MPs 1425